Liang Jie (born June 16, 1994)  is a Chinese actress. She is best known for her roles in the dramas The Eternal Love (2017), Handsome Siblings (2020), and You Are My Destiny (2020).

Biography
Liang made her acting debut in the 2016 drama Go! Goal! Fighting!.

In 2017, Liang rose to fame for her role as Qu Tan'er in the time-travel historical romance drama The Eternal Love and its sequel.

In 2020, Liang played the role of Su Ying in the wuxia drama Handsome Siblings, based on the novel Juedai Shuangjiao by Gu Long. The same year she starred in the romance drama You Are My Destiny alongside The Eternal Love co-star Xing Zhaolin. The series is a remake of the 2008 Taiwanese drama Fated to Love You.

Personal life
In February 2018, Liang Jie got engaged to actor Purba Rgyal .
But on May 18, 2021, they had announced their peaceful breakup.

Filmography

Television series

Discography

Awards and nominations

References

External links 

 
 
 

1994 births
Living people
Central Academy of Drama alumni
Actresses from Fujian
Chinese film actresses
Chinese television actresses
21st-century Chinese actresses